"Reformation" is the tenth episode of the third season of the HBO original series The Wire. The episode was written by Ed Burns from a story by David Simon & Ed Burns and was directed by Christine Moore. It originally aired on November 28, 2004.

Plot
Young Stanfield dealers Justin and Jamal hear gunfire and come across the body of LaTroy, a Stanfield lieutenant; they are picked up in a truck by Snoop and Tote. Meanwhile, Marlo and Partlow set up a night time ambush for Devonne, whom Marlo brutally shoots in the breasts and mouth. Marlo assures Partlow that the murder was necessary. As Holley works the murder scene of another Stanfield dealer,  Fruit sees the body. At a safe house, Slim Charles tells Avon that two of Marlo's people have been killed. The resulting police crackdown affects Proposition Joe, Fat-Face Rick and Phil Boy.

Bell learns from Shamrock that they are running low on product and money. Bell meets with the Co-Op and is informed that they are pursuing a truce with Marlo and have voted to shut the Barksdales out if the turf war continues. Bell blames the impasse on Avon and his hubris. Avon nonetheless insists that the war will continue following Marlo's murder of Devonne. At his copy shop, Bell reluctantly phones the Western District police. Later, Bell finds that the development grants promised to him by Senator Davis have instead been awarded to another company. He gives Shamrock some documents to take to their lawyer, Maurice Levy.

In the Western, Colvin urges Carver to learn his beat and neighborhood so that he can protect them properly, drawing a distinction between the drug war and real policing. Mello informs Colvin that journalists have learned about Hamsterdam. While Herc and Truck are taking the reporter on a tour of the free zones, Colvin arrives and tries to spin a story about Hamsterdam being part of an enforcement strategy. The reporter agrees to hold the story for a week. Colvin discusses his options with Mello and his community relations sergeant, ultimately deciding to admit his involvement and face the consequences.

At the next ComStat meeting, Colvin gives a presentation explaining how Hamsterdam positively affected his district. Rawls realizes that Colvin has essentially legalized the drug trade in specific areas, leading Burrell to demand to see Colvin in his office. Colvin tells Burrell that he is willing to take the fall for the scheme, but threatens to lie about who sanctioned it if any of his subordinates are punished for his actions. Colvin further tells Burrell that a Baltimore Sun reporter is delaying a story on Hamsterdam. Burell threatens to fire Colvin outright. Later, Colvin tells McNulty that an informant has revealed the location of Avon's waterfront condo; he resists McNulty's attempts to find out more information about the informant, who is actually Bell.

Carcetti and D'Agostino chair a campaign strategy meeting in which it's agreed that African-American endorsements and staffers are needed. D'Agostino outlines the importance of keeping Gray in the race in order to split the black vote. Carcetti admits to his wife that he feels guilty about betraying Gray. She suggests that he tell Gray that he also plans to run, but Carcetti worries that this may drive Gray out of the race, indirectly undermining his own chances. Meanwhile, Burrell informs Mayor Royce and Parker about Colvin's actions. After Burrell tells Royce about the crime reduction and support for Colvin from the mayor's voting bloc, Royce contemplates how to use the information.

McNulty complains to Freamon that they are still not up on any wiretaps and are probably missing drug conspiracy phone calls. Daniels and Pearlman meet with Judge Phelan to discuss their difficulties with drug dealers discarding phones. Phelan offers to sign wiretap affidavits at any time as they uncover phone numbers. McNulty wants to rush the paperwork and is disappointed that Phelan is the assigned judge, still angry at his behavior during the first Barksdale investigation. Daniels points out that McNulty believes that anyone who gets in his way is worthless; McNulty concedes the point.

Freamon matches Bodie's voice to a prior recording of a phone call to his grandmother, which is used as probable cause for a wiretap. Over the wire, the Major Case Unit overhears Bodie ordering a resupply for a dealer known as Tweety Bird. McNulty meets up with Greggs and observes Bodie's meeting. Meanwhile, Daniels informs the rest of the unit that Prez's shooting is being investigated by internal affairs. Under Daniels' questioning, Freamon and Massey deny noticing any racist behavior from Prez. While waiting for Bodie's meeting, McNulty tells Greggs about his failed relationship with D'Agostino, complaining that she seemed to question his intelligence.

When the Barksdales ditch their phones, McNulty and Freamon propose that the unit supply new phones directly to Bernard. McNulty and Greggs visit Bubbles, who recognizes Squeak and agrees to talk to her. The next day, as Greggs and McNulty meet with Bubbles, McNulty thinks he spots Beadie Russell driving past; he chases the car, but the driver is not Beadie. Upon meeting Bubbles, Squeak arranges a meeting between Bernard and Freamon, who is posing as Bubbles' phone supplier. Freamon takes Bernard to a staged cell phone shop, where Massey poses as Freamon's niece and assistant. Bernard is taken in, but insists on doctored receipts as part of the deal.

Meanwhile, Brother Mouzone and his aide Lamar return to Baltimore and meet with Vinson, who gives him a description of Omar. Mouzone sends the homophobic Lamar into a gay bar (where he unwittingly encounters Rawls in one of them) to find him. Omar's boyfriend Dante notices Lamar's search and confronts him, only to be captured by Mouzone. Omar meets with Butchie to discuss the Barksdales' near-shooting of his grandmother. Butchie, disgusted that the Sunday truce was broken, tells Omar where their home base is located. Omar is outraged that Butchie has kept this information from him until now, but Butchie says that he was trying to protect him. Omar begins to stake out the Barksdales' funeral home and sees Bell leaving.

A visit from the Deacon prompts Cutty to visit Hamsterdam, where Carver suggests that he recruit disruptive kids from the time-out corner for his boxing gym. Cutty breaks up a fight involving Justin and Spider and teaches some boxing moves. Later, Justin and his friends visit the gym, mock the dilapidated equipment, and start an impromptu football game. Cutty, overwhelmed by the rowdiness, lashes out at Justin and the other boys, which in turn causes them to leave the gym. Cutty discusses his difficulty with the trainer of another gym, who encourages Cutty to remain patient and show the children that he has faith in them by not letting them fail. Cutty returns to Hamsterdam and apologizes to Justin. Later, Justin returns to the gym and finds Cutty training a young enthusiast.

Production

Title reference
The title refers to the theme of season three with various characters struggling to initiate reform on a personal and citywide level. In this episode Cutty's attempts at personal reform come to fruition when he starts his gym, Colvin's attempt to reform the drug war are exposed and Brother Mouzone remarks on the empty political promises of reform in Baltimore marked by the collapse of the towers.

Epigraph

This phrase is originally said by Prop Joe in regards to the Barksdale organization.  However, the line may also allude to several 'leadership crises' present in the episode, including: Cutty learning how to coach kids, Colvin legalizing drugs without Commissioner Burrell's knowledge, Carcetti's dilemma over whether or not to betray Tony, and (of course) Avon refusing to back off his war with Marlo.

Credits

Starring cast
Although credited, Wendell Pierce and Jim True-Frost do not appear in this episode.

Guest stars
Glynn Turman as Mayor Clarence Royce
Peter Gerety as Judge Daniel Phelan
Jamie Hector as Marlo Stanfield
Chad L. Coleman as Dennis "Cutty" Wise
Brandy Burre as Theresa D'Agostino
Michael Potts as Brother Mouzone
Melvin Williams as The Deacon
Robert F. Chew as Proposition Joe
Richard Burton as Shamrock
Anwan Glover as Slim Charles
DeAndre McCullough as Lamar
S. Robert Morgan as Butchie
Gbenga Akinnagbe as Chris Partlow
Megan Anderson as Jen Carcetti
R. Emery Bright as Community Relations Sergeant
Norris Davis as Vinson
Jay Landsman as Lieutenant Dennis Mello
Sho "Swordsman" Brown as Phil Boy
Tony D. Head as Major Bobby Reed
Marty Lodge as Banisky - Baltimore Sun reporter
Felicia Pearson as Snoop
Cleo Reginald Pizana as Chief of Staff Coleman Parker
Mia Arnice Chambers as Squeak
Tiana Harris as Devonne
Melvin Jackson, Jr. as Bernard
Brian Anthony Wilson as Detective Vernon Holley
Troj. Marquis Strickland as Fat-Face Rick

Uncredited appearances
Ernest Waddell as Dante
Brandon Fobbs as Fruit
Justin Burley as Justin
Melvin T. Russell as Jamal
Rico Sterling as Tyrell
Joilet F. Harris as Officer Caroline Massey
Ryan Sands as Officer Lloyd "Truck" Garrick
Edward Green as Spider
Marc Krinsky as Angelo Martin
Raw Leiba as Stringer's Bodyguard
Nakia Dillard as Lambert
Unknown as Pete Sinopli
Unknown as Tote
Unknown as Barman in gay club

References

External links
"Reformation" at HBO.com

The Wire (season 3) episodes
2004 American television episodes